Adada is a 1987 South Korean film directed by Im Kwon-taek, based on a story by Kye Yong-mook.

Plot
The film tells the story of a deaf-mute woman living in a small village in Korea during the 1920s.

Cast
Shin Hye-soo
Han Ji-il
Lee Geung-young
Kim Ji-young
Jeon Moo-song
Park Wung

Awards
Best Actress (Shin Hye-soo), Montreal World Film Festival

References

Sources

External links

Films directed by Im Kwon-taek
1980s Korean-language films
South Korean drama films
Films set in Korea under Japanese rule
Grand Prize Paeksang Arts Award (Film) winners